The following lists events that happened in 2015 in the Kingdom of Belgium.

Incumbents
Monarch: Philippe
Prime Minister: Charles Michel

Events

January
 January 3 - Belgian media reports that serial rapist and murderer Frank Van Den Bleeken will be euthanised in prison in Bruges on 11 January.
 January 15 - Belgian police kill two suspected terrorists in an anti-terrorism raid near Verviers.

June
 June 28 - A coach driver from Northern Ireland is killed and several teachers and schoolchildren from Brentwood in Essex are injured after a coach crashes near Ostend.

November
 November 6 - Resignation of André-Joseph Léonard as archbishop of Mechelen-Brussels comes into effect; Jozef De Kesel, bishop of Bruges, named as his successor.
 November 21 to 25 - Brussels lockdown in the wake of the November 2015 Paris attacks.

December
 December 12 - Jozef De Kesel installed as archbishop of Mechelen-Brussels

Deaths
 13 November – Éliane Vogel-Polsky (born 1926) lawyer and feminist

See also
2015 in Belgian television

References

 
Years of the 21st century in Belgium
Belgium
Belgium
2010s in Belgium